In mathematics, the Lyapunov time is the characteristic timescale on which a dynamical system is chaotic. It is named after the Russian mathematician Aleksandr Lyapunov.  It is defined as the inverse of a system's largest Lyapunov exponent.

Use
The Lyapunov time mirrors the limits of the predictability of the system. By convention, it is defined as the time for the distance between nearby trajectories of the system to increase by a factor of e. However, measures in terms of 2-foldings and 10-foldings are sometimes found, since they correspond to the loss of one bit of information or one digit of precision respectively.

While it is used in many applications of dynamical systems theory, it has been particularly used in celestial mechanics where it is important for the problem of the stability of the Solar System. However, empirical estimation of the Lyapunov time is often associated with computational or inherent uncertainties.

Examples
Typical values are:

See also
 Belousov–Zhabotinsky reaction
 Molecular chaos
 Three-body problem

References

Dynamical systems